Wang Nan (born 15 December 1970) is a Chinese judoka. He competed in the men's middleweight event at the 1992 Summer Olympics.

References

1970 births
Living people
Chinese male judoka
Olympic judoka of China
Judoka at the 1992 Summer Olympics
Place of birth missing (living people)